The Land Beyond the Law is a 1927 American silent Western film directed by Harry Joe Brown and written by Marion Jackson. The film stars Ken Maynard, Dorothy Dwan, Tom Santschi, Noah Young, Gibson Gowland and Billy Butts. The film was released on June 5, 1927, by First National Pictures.

Plot summary

Cast 
 Ken Maynard as Jerry Steele
 Dorothy Dwan as Ginger O'Hara
 Tom Santschi as Bob Crew
 Noah Young as Hanzup Harry
 Gibson Gowland as Silent 'Oklahoma' Joe
 Billy Butts as Pat O'Hara

References

External links
 
 
 

1927 films
1927 Western (genre) films
First National Pictures films
Films directed by Harry Joe Brown
American black-and-white films
Silent American Western (genre) films
1920s English-language films
1920s American films